Allen Brown (March 2, 1943 – January 27, 2020) was an American football tight end in the National Football League for the Green Bay Packers. He played college football at the University of Mississippi.

Early years 
He attended Natchez High School, where he was a three-sport athlete and almost chose Louisiana State University for college.

Playing for Johnny Vaught at Ole Miss, Brown lettered three times (1962–64) and was a co-captain of the 1964 team. He was recognized as All-America by several publications for the 1964 season and was a first-team All-SEC selection his final two years. He was inducted into Ole Miss Athletic Hall of Fame in 1989 and the Mississippi Sports Hall of Fame in 2010. In 2004, Brown was honored by the Southeastern Conference as an SEC football legend. He was honored with "Allen Brown Day" in his hometown.

Professional career 
Brown was drafted by the Packers in the third round (38th overall) of the 1965 NFL Draft. He was also drafted by the San Diego Chargers in the third round (22nd overall) of the 1965 American Football League Draft.  Brown signed with the Packers in December 1964. He missed the whole 1965 season with a dislocated shoulder. Brown played five games in the 1966 season before injuring his knee. He played in every game in 1967, recording three receptions, before he ruptured a kidney against the Pittsburgh Steelers in the final game. He retired the next spring.

Post-career life 
Brown had two sons who played at Ole Miss as well, Timothy Brown and Burkes Brown. He died on January 27, 2020.

References

1943 births
2020 deaths
American football tight ends
Green Bay Packers players
Sportspeople from Natchez, Mississippi
Players of American football from Mississippi
Ole Miss Rebels football players